A familiar is a supernatural entity believed to assist witches and cunning folk in their practice of magic.

Familiar may also refer to:

Literature
The Familiars (novel), a 2010 series of children's fantasy books
The Familiar (novel), 41st book in the Animorphs series
The Familiar, a book series by Mark Z. Danielewski starting with The Familiar, Volume 1: One Rainy Day in May
Familiar, a 2015 play by Danai Gurira

Music
Familiar, a 2012 album by Brooke Miller
Familiars (album), 2014 album by The Antlers
Familiar, a 2017 album by Dieter Moebius
"Familiar" (song), a 2018 song by Liam Payne and J Balvin

Other
T–V distinction, contrast between second-person pronouns that are specialized for varying levels of familiarity
The Familiar (film), 2009 film
Familiar Linux, Linux distribution for iPAQ machines and other PDAs
"Familiar" (The X-Files), a 2018 episode of the American science fiction television series The X-Files

See also
Familiaris, a close associate of the king in several medieval courts
Familiarity (disambiguation)